In Greek mythology, Schoeneus (Ancient Greek: Σχοινεύς Skhoineús, literally "rushy") was the name of several individuals:

Schoeneus, a Boeotian king, the son of Athamas and Themisto. He may have emigrated to Arcadia, where a village Schoenous and a river Schoeneus flowing by it were believed to have been named after him, and where his children were believed to have originated from. He was the father of Atalanta, and also of the Arcadian Clymenus.
Schoeneus, son of Autonous (son of Melaneus) and Hippodamia. He was the brother of Erodius, Acanthus, Acanthis and Anthus. When the latter was killed by their father's horses, Zeus and Apollo pitied Schoeneus and transformed him into a bird.
Schoeneus, a man who reared Orestes, from whose home Orestes directed to Argos to avenge the death of his father on Clytaemnestra.

Notes

References 

 Antoninus Liberalis, The Metamorphoses of Antoninus Liberalis translated by Francis Celoria (Routledge 1992). Online version at the Topos Text Project.
Apollodorus, The Library with an English Translation by Sir James George Frazer, F.B.A., F.R.S. in 2 Volumes, Cambridge, MA, Harvard University Press; London, William Heinemann Ltd. 1921. . Online version at the Perseus Digital Library. Greek text available from the same website.
Diodorus Siculus, The Library of History translated by Charles Henry Oldfather. Twelve volumes. Loeb Classical Library. Cambridge, Massachusetts: Harvard University Press; London: William Heinemann, Ltd. 1989. Vol. 3. Books 4.59–8. Online version at Bill Thayer's Web Site
 Diodorus Siculus, Bibliotheca Historica. Vol 1-2. Immanel Bekker. Ludwig Dindorf. Friedrich Vogel. in aedibus B. G. Teubneri. Leipzig. 1888-1890. Greek text available at the Perseus Digital Library.
 Nonnus of Panopolis, Dionysiaca translated by William Henry Denham Rouse (1863-1950), from the Loeb Classical Library, Cambridge, MA, Harvard University Press, 1940.  Online version at the Topos Text Project.
 Nonnus of Panopolis, Dionysiaca. 3 Vols. W.H.D. Rouse. Cambridge, MA., Harvard University Press; London, William Heinemann, Ltd. 1940-1942. Greek text available at the Perseus Digital Library.
 Pausanias, Description of Greece with an English Translation by W.H.S. Jones, Litt.D., and H.A. Ormerod, M.A., in 4 Volumes. Cambridge, MA, Harvard University Press; London, William Heinemann Ltd. 1918. . Online version at the Perseus Digital Library
Pausanias, Graeciae Descriptio. 3 vols. Leipzig, Teubner. 1903.  Greek text available at the Perseus Digital Library.
 Publius Ovidius Naso, The Epistles of Ovid. London. J. Nunn, Great-Queen-Street; R. Priestly, 143, High-Holborn; R. Lea, Greek-Street, Soho; and J. Rodwell, New-Bond-Street. 1813. Online version at the Perseus Digital Library.
 Publius Ovidius Naso, Metamorphoses translated by Brookes More (1859-1942). Boston, Cornhill Publishing Co. 1922. Online version at the Perseus Digital Library.
 Publius Ovidius Naso, Metamorphoses. Hugo Magnus. Gotha (Germany). Friedr. Andr. Perthes. 1892. Latin text available at the Perseus Digital Library.
 Publius Ovidius Naso, Tristia (The Early Letters from Tomis AD 8-12) translated by A. S. Kline. © Copyright 2003. Online version at the Topos Text Project.
 Publius Ovidius Naso, Tristia. Arthur Leslie Wheeler. Cambridge, MA. Harvard University Press. 1939. Latin text available at the Perseus Digital Library.
 Stephanus of Byzantium, Stephani Byzantii Ethnicorum quae supersunt, edited by August Meineike (1790-1870), published 1849. A few entries from this important ancient handbook of place names have been translated by Brady Kiesling. Online version at the Topos Text Project.

Family of Athamas
Kings in Greek mythology
Boeotian characters in Greek mythology
Deeds of Zeus
Arcadian mythology
Metamorphoses into birds in Greek mythology